Party Crasher is the third English solo album by Swedish pop-rock singer and composer Per Gessle. This is his second worldwide-released English solo album under his own name after The World According to Gessle in 1997. Originally scheduled for release on 3 December in Sweden, it was actually released a week earlier on 26 November. The album reached #2 in the Swedish album charts, curiously becoming the first Gessle involved studio album that did not reach #1 in Sweden since Roxette´s Pearls of Passion, in 1986.

When the album was released via Sony BMG in the UK on 15 June 2009, some fans were disappointed when it was realised that the CD version of the album would only be available to order online and no physical copies were to be available in record stores.

Formats

 CD – containing the 12-track album (jewelcase version).
 CD – containing the 12-track album (digipack version).
 iTunes deluxe edition – digital download 12-track edition, plus one bonus track.
 Telia deluxe edition – digital download 12-track edition, plus one bonus track (different from the iTunes edition).
 LP limited edition – 12-track edition (6 on each side).

Track listing
All music and lyrics by Per Gessle, unless stated.

 "Silly Really"  – 3:40
 "The Party Pleaser"  – 3:39
 "Stuck Here With Me"  – 3:20
 "Sing Along"  – 4:00
 "Gut Feeling"  – 3:34
 "Perfect Excuse"  – 3:11
 "Breathe Life Into Me"  – 3:41
 "Hey, I Died And Went to Heaven"  – 4:00
 "Kissing Is The Key"  – 3:08
 "Thai With A Twist"  – 2:41
 "I Didn't Mean to Turn You On"  – 3:35
 "Doesn't Make Sense"  – 3:50

Bonus tracks

iTunes deluxe edition:
  "I'm Glad You Called"  – 3:29
  "Silly Really" (Right Into Your Bed Remix) (Remixed by Dick Mixon) – 6:31

Telia deluxe edition:
  "Theme from Roberta Right" (Music: Per Gessle & Gabriel Gessle – Lyrics: Per Gessle) – 3:04

Personnel

 Produced by Clarence Öfwerman, Christoffer Lundquist & Per Gessle
 Recorded at Aerosol Grey Machine, Vallarum, Sweden, between January & September 2008
 Engineer: Christoffer Lundquist; assistant engineer Lennart Haglund
 Mixed at Kingside, Stockholm, by Ronni Lahti in August–September 2008
 Track 4 mixed at Aerosol Grey Machine by Christoffer Lundquist in September 2008
 Words & music by Per Gessle, published by Jimmy Fun Music
 Played & sung by Per Gessle, Christoffer Lundquist, Clarence Öfwerman & Helena Josefsson
 Cover design by Pär Wickholm & Per Gessle
 Photos by Important Pete, Woody (Åsa Nordin-Gessle) & private
 Mastered by Henke at Masters of Audio, Stockholm
 Management: Marie Dimberg/D&D Management, Stockholm

Release history

Charts

Weekly charts

Year-end charts

Certifications

References

External links
 
 Per Gessle's official site

2008 albums
Per Gessle albums